This is a list of colleges in Alberta. Post-secondary education in the Canadian province of Alberta is regulated by the Ministry of Advanced Education. Alberta has the following tertiary education institutions:

Publicly funded colleges
Alberta's publicly funded colleges may offer academic upgrading, job readiness, apprenticeship, certificate, diploma, university transfer, baccalaureate and applied degree programs.

Technical institutes
Source:

Private Technical institute

Private colleges
The following private colleges are accredited to grant degrees:

The following private colleges offer programs licensed by the Private Career Colleges branch in accordance with the Private Vocational Training Act and Regulation:

See also
Education in Alberta
Higher education in Alberta
Higher education in Canada
List of business schools in Canada
List of Canadian universities by endowment
List of colleges in Canada
List of law schools in Canada
List of universities in Canada

References

External links
Government of Alberta - Innovation and Advanced Education > Post-Secondary System

 
Alberta universities, List of
Colleges